IceWorks is an ice arena in Aston, Pennsylvania USA, 15 minutes southwest of downtown Philadelphia, Pennsylvania and 10 minutes northeast of Wilmington, Delaware. IceWorks Skating Complex opened in October 1997. The building consists of four ice surfaces, a full-service restaurant, and other amenities. Since opening in 1997, Iceworks has not updated its bathrooms or cleaning processes.

IceWorks is one of the only public rinks in the United States or Canada with a professional coaching staff. Jim Watson, former Philadelphia Flyer, leads the hockey staff along with the rink's General Manager Stephane Charbonneau. Uschi Keszler, coach of Olympic skater Elvis Stojko, leads a Figure Skating staff of 18 full-time coaches. Public skating is also offered for people of all ages.

It is also the training center of many national, international, world, and Olympic coaches and competitors, including being the host facility for the Liberty Open Summer Competition.  This competition is the largest non-qualifying figure skating competition in the world and one that draws many national and international competitors. The IceWorks Skating Club has hosted many U.S. regional and sectional championships in its ten-year existence.

Olympic athletes Tanith Belbin and Ben Agosto (USA), and Oksana Domnina and Maxim Shabalin (Russia) trained at the facility in preparation for the 2010 Winter Olympics in Vancouver, British Columbia, Canada.  Belbin and Agosto are the first skaters representing the IceWorks Skating Club to win a world medal.

The rink is also notable for hosting Neumann University's Men's and Women's ice hockey home games, as well as the home of the Philadelphia Little Flyers junior ice hockey team. The arena is also home to many junior hockey tournaments and international competitions in figure skating. Celebrity Boxing also holds events at IceWorks, including appearances by former Major League Baseball player Jose Canseco.

The facility's main competitors are Ice Line in West Chester, PA, The Pond in Newark, DE, and Oaks Center Ice in Phoenixville, PA.

IceWorks is also home to two Special Hockey International teams, the Philadelphia Fearless Flyers and the Bucks County Admirals. The Bucks County Admirals use IceWorks as their second home arena. Their first home arena is the Bucks County Ice Sports Center.

IceWorks was the host site for the 2012 United States Men's Curling Championship and the 2012 United States Women's Curling Championship.

On January 24, 2009, IceWorks was the host of a celebrity boxing match between Danny Bonaduce and José Canseco that ended in a majority draw.

References

External links
 IceWorks
 Bucks County Admirals Website

Sports venues in Pennsylvania
Indoor arenas in Pennsylvania
1997 establishments in Pennsylvania
Sports venues completed in 1997
Indoor ice hockey venues in Pennsylvania
College ice hockey venues in the United States